Jens Potteck (born 5 October 1968 in Wittenberge) is a German former sport shooter who competed in the 1988 Summer Olympics in 10 m air pistol. His brother, Uwe Potteck, is also an Olympic shooter.

References

1968 births
Living people
German male sport shooters
ISSF pistol shooters
Olympic shooters of East Germany
Shooters at the 1988 Summer Olympics
People from Wittenberge
Sportspeople from Brandenburg